The Al-Zubair 2 is a Sudanese main battle tank based on the Chinese Type 59D.

Country of origin

Military Industry Corporation

Characteristics

Combat weight	37ton
Crew	4
Cruising Range	350 km
Power to weight ratio	19.7 hp/ton
General Pressure	87kPa

Power Pack

Power	730 hp
Cooling	Water cooled
Fuel	Diesel
Transmission	Fixed - shaft type
Turning	Skid
Final Drive	Planetary Type

Armament

Main Gun	105 mm. Smooth bore

Ammunition

Main Gun	45
AAMG	500
Co-Axial MG	2500
Grenades	20

Dimension

Length (gun forward position)	9.973 m
Width	3.390 m
Height	2.400 m

FCS

Type	Image Stabmzed Fire Control System with LRF ballistic computer and auto sensors
Optics	LASER Protected
Firing Capacity	S-S, S-M
NVD'S	Image intensifir slehtino system

Protection

Add on Armour	Composite ( Frontal Arc)
Explosive Reactive armou	installed
Fire Extinguishing & Explosion Suppression	Yes
Smoke discharge System	Yes
Running Gear

Tracks Steel Suspension

Type: Shock Absorber & Torsion bars Rubber padded
Bump Stop: Rubber padded

Performance

Max speed	57 km/hr
T ranch Crossing	2.7 m
Obstacle Crossing	0.8m
Gradient	60%
Side Slope	30%

Ammunition type

APESDS. HEAT, HE 
Separately loaded
Co-axial MG	7.62 X 54 mm
AAMG	12.7mm
LRF

Type	NdYAG
Range	200 – 5000 m
Radio System

Type	889 T
Freguency Range	20 - 49.975 MHZ
Distance Range	20 – 25 km

References

Military of Sudan